Emma Redington Thayer (pseudonym, Lee Thayer; Troy, Pennsylvania April 5, 1874 - San Diego, California November 18, 1973) was an American artist and writer of mystery novels.

Biography
Emma Redington Lee was born April 5, 1874. She studied at Cooper Union and Pratt Institute. Her husband was Harry Thayer, an artist.

Thayer wrote 60  mystery novels about well-mannered private investigator Peter Clancy and his valet, Wiggar. She wrote her first novel, The Mystery of the Thirteenth Floor in 1919. Her last novel, Dusty Death, was published in 1966, when she was 92.

Thayer and her husband opened a publisher's art service, which specialized in book jacket art work.

On May 11, 1958, Thayer was a contestant on What's My Line?

References

External links
 Lee Thayer Bibliography

1874 births
1973 deaths
People from Bradford County, Pennsylvania
Place of death missing
American mystery writers
American women novelists
20th-century American novelists
Pseudonymous women writers
20th-century American women writers
20th-century pseudonymous writers
Cooper Union alumni
Pratt Institute alumni